Odaköy can refer to the following villages in Turkey:

 Odaköy, Dursunbey
 Odaköy, Sandıklı